is a Japanese professional footballer who plays for Gamba Osaka in the J1 League. He is mainly deployed as a forward.

Club career

J.League
His mother, Mariko, is Japanese and his father, Robert, is Jamaican. He was born in Jamaica but grew up in Ōta, Japan.

Suzuki entered Kiryu Daiichi High School and played for the school football club. In the 2011 season, the team advanced to the All Japan High School Soccer Tournament.

After graduating high school in 2012, Suzuki signed a professional contract with Albirex Niigata. On 4 April 2012, Suzuki made his first team debut against Shimizu S-Pulse in the J. League Cup as a 46th-minute substitute. He scored his first goal for the club in a 4–3 League Cup victory over Omiya Ardija.

V-Varen Nagasaki signed Suzuki before the start of the 2018 J1 season.

International career
Born in Jamaica to a Jamaican father and raised in Japan by his Japanese mother, Suzuki is eligible to represent both Jamaica and Japan. In June 2011, Suzuki was called up to the Japan under-17 national team for the 2011 FIFA U-17 World Cup. He played in four matches.

He participated in the 2016 AFC U23 Championship for Japan, eventually winning the tournament. In August 2016, he was also called up to the Japan under-23 side for the 2016 Summer Olympics. He played in two matches and scored a goal against Nigeria.

He made his senior debut for the Japan on 22 March 2019, starting in a friendly against Colombia.

Career statistics

Club
.

International

Scores and results list Japan's goal tally first, score column indicates score after each Suzuki goal.

Honours

International
Japan U23
 AFC U23 Championship: 2016

References

External links
 
 
 Musashi Suzuki at data.j-league.or.jp 
 Musashi Suzuki at www.jleague.jp (archive) 
 Musashi Suzuki at V-Varen Nagasaki (archived) 
 

1994 births
Living people
Japanese footballers
Jamaican footballers
Japan youth international footballers
Japan international footballers
Association football people from Gunma Prefecture
J1 League players
J2 League players
J3 League players
Belgian Pro League players
Albirex Niigata players
Mito HollyHock players
J.League U-22 Selection players
Matsumoto Yamaga FC players
V-Varen Nagasaki players
Hokkaido Consadole Sapporo players
K Beerschot VA players
Gamba Osaka players
Footballers at the 2014 Asian Games
Olympic footballers of Japan
Footballers at the 2016 Summer Olympics
Japanese expatriate footballers
Expatriate footballers in Belgium
Association football wingers
Association football forwards
Japanese people of Jamaican descent
Jamaican people of Japanese descent
Citizens of Japan through descent
Asian Games competitors for Japan